The following is a list of pipeline accidents in the United States in 1972. It is one of several lists of U.S. pipeline accidents. See also: list of natural gas and oil production accidents in the United States.

Incidents 

This is not a complete list of all pipeline accidents. For natural gas alone, the Pipeline and Hazardous Materials Safety Administration (PHMSA), a United States Department of Transportation agency, has collected data on more than 3,200 accidents deemed serious or significant since 1987.

A "significant incident" results in any of the following consequences:
 Fatality or injury requiring in-patient hospitalization.
 $50,000 or more in total costs, measured in 1984 dollars.
 Liquid releases of five or more barrels (42 US gal/barrel).
 Releases resulting in an unintentional fire or explosion.

PHMSA and the National Transportation Safety Board (NTSB) post-incident data and results of investigations into accidents involving pipelines that carry a variety of products, including natural gas, oil, diesel fuel, gasoline, kerosene, jet fuel, carbon dioxide, and other substances. Occasionally pipelines are re-purposed to carry different products.

The following incidents occurred during 1972:
 1972 On January 7, a huge explosion and fire occurred on a 24-inch gas transmission pipeline west of Centerville, Iowa. The fire was visible for far around. There were no injuries or major property damage.
 1972 The second pipeline leak in a month into the Tippecanoe River in Indiana on a Buckeye Pipeline company (now Buckeye Partners ) line hit on January 12. The Buckeye Pipeline was owned by the bankrupt Penn Central Railroad, preventing money from being spent on repairs. One EPA official stated "they know they have a leaky system".
 1972 On January 11, a 10-inch pipeline ruptured in Clinton, Montana, spilling  of diesel fuel, with some of it reaching the Clark Fork River.
 1972 The rupture of a 20-inch gas pipeline shut down most of the gas supply for Joplin, Missouri on January 28. An estimated 25,000 people were affected.
 1972 During the blowdown of a dehydrator, LPG fumes caught fire at Conway, Kansas on January 29, killing a pipeline company worker.
 1972 A Colonial Pipeline pipeline ruptured in Cobb County, Georgia on February 2, spilling about 2,000 gallons of fuel oil into the Chattahoochee River upstream of a water intake for the city of Atlanta. Much work went into keeping the spill from the water intake. There were no injuries.
 1972 On February 12, a Conoco pipeline rupture spilled  of diesel fuel into the Spokane River near Spokane, Washington.
 1972 On March 24, a 2-inch steel gas main was pulled out of a compression coupling, at Annandale, Virginia, causing a leak. Natural gas later exploded, killing three people, injuring one other person, and, destroying two homes.
 1972 On May 14, a shutdown, closed-in 8-inch pipeline owned by the Exxon Pipe Line Company ruptured near Hearne, Texas. Crude oil at an initial pressure of 530 p.s.i.g. sprayed from a 6-inch irregular split on top of the pipe. The crude oil flowed along a small stream and was dammed up 1 foot deep in a stock pond 1,800 feet from the leak. At 5 a.m., vapors from the crude oil, which continued to leak from the rupture, entered a small frame house 600 feet away and were somehow ignited. The resultant explosion killed one person, seriously burned two others, destroyed the house, melted nearby communication lines, and scorched an 1,800-foot-long area. An estimated 332,346 gallons of crude burned.
 1972 On June 15, a crew was welding on a gas main in Bryan, Ohio that had been shut off, when someone inadvertently opened a valve that fed gas into that main. The gas ignited, and exploded, seriously injuring two workers.
 1972 A 12-inch diameter high-pressure propane pipeline, near Butler, Alabama, was ruptured by a road grader. A short time after the line was ruptured, a car drove into the vapor cloud. The car stalled, and trying to restart it was suspected to have ignited the vapor cloud, killing four people. (June 20, 1972)
 1972 On August 9, heavy equipment ruptured a butane pipeline near Houston, Texas. One person was injured.
 1972 Two pipeline workers were injured on August 15, when a lid on a pipeline pig trap blew off of a gas pipeline, near Barstow, Texas. A fire followed.
 1972 A gasoline pipeline ruptured and ignited at a Plantation Pipeline Terminal in Bremen, Georgia on September 6. For a time, there were fears the fire might spread to nearby fuel storage tanks, but the fire was limited to the pipeline.
 1972 On October 10, a crude oil spill was spotted coming from a leaking oil pipeline off of Grand Isle, Louisiana. About 8,000 barrels of crude were spilled.
 1972 On October 10, a Texas-New Mexico Pipeline Company crude oil pipeline ruptured near Shiprock, New Mexico, spilling  of crude oil into the San Juan River, polluting it for 100 miles. Later, it was discovered that the pipeline company had increased pressure on the pipeline before the rupture to make up for an earlier pipeline shut down.
 1972 On October 30, a bulldozer working on a power company construction project ruptured a gas main in Lake City, Minnesota. Leaking gas accumulated, then exploded, in a nearby variety store, killing six and injuring nine.
 1972 On November 15, a 24 inch diameter natural gas pipeline rupture ejected a 30 foot section of pipe, which was followed by fire, near Abbeville, Louisiana. There were no injuries reported. 
 1972 A leak in a weld on a 36-inch gas transmission pipeline on November 18 in Bend, Oregon forced the shutdown of gas service to 3,000 customers.

References

Lists of pipeline accidents in the United States
pipeline accidents
1972 in the environment
1972 in the United States